The Vault, titled Way Down in various regions, is a 2021 Spanish action thriller film directed by Jaume Balagueró. The film stars Freddie Highmore, Àstrid Bergès-Frisbey, Sam Riley, Liam Cunningham, Luis Tosar, Axel Stein, José Coronado and Famke Janssen. The story bears a passing resemblance to that of the Black Swan Project, recovered in 2007 by Odyssey Marine Exploration, a private marine salvage firm, but later turned over to Spain after 5 years of legal wrangling.

Plot 
Thom is a gifted engineering student at Cambridge University who is being courted by recruiters from several major oil companies, all promising him increasingly richer salaries and job perks if he agrees to work for them. Thom dismisses the offers, later explaining to his oil executive father over dinner that he does not want the life a career in the oil industry would bring him. During this conversation, he receives an anonymous text message from somebody observing him in the restaurant who tells him to meet at a club.

He goes to the location he is instructed and meets a woman named Lorraine, who then introduces him to Walter, who runs a salvaging company that had recovered a large treasure known as "the treasure of Guadalupe" but it was seized by the Spanish government because Walter's company was not legally salvaging the site.

Walter has put together a team consisting members with various skillsets including Lorraine, a con artist; Simon, a logistics expert; Klaus, a computer hacker; and James, Walter's longtime treasure-hunting partner. Walter needs Thom's engineering genius to help them breach the vault that holds the confiscated treasure inside the Bank of Spain. Thom agrees to help and joins them in Madrid during the 2010 World Cup as Spain is contending for the championship title. Using the crowd noise from the many fans gathered in the city to watch the matches as cover, they scout the bank and determine that the vault sits on a giant scale underneath a large water reservoir. If the weight on the scale fluctuates in the slightest, the vault floods, drowning any intruders who might be inside.

Needing to find a solution before the finals, after which the crowd will disperse, Thom soon determines that they can defeat the scale by freezing it with 500 liters of nitrogen, slowing the mechanics of the scale long enough that it would not register their presence and trigger a flood while they retrieve the treasure.

They move forward with their plan, with Simon successfully freezing the scale beneath the floor of the vault while Thom, Lorraine, and James perilously make their way inside. Thom's plan has worked but the scale begins thawing much quicker than expected, so the trio rush to find the item in the containers they are looking for: a collection of three coins from Sir Francis Drake that describe where to find his massive treasure hoard.

As they locate the coins, Gustavo, the head of bank security, has regained control of his systems after they were unknowingly penetrated by Klaus days earlier. Having learned in the days prior that the team had already infiltrated the bank to scout it, he dispatches a strike team to arrest the intruders. Believing they are compromised, Walter tells the trio to surrender to the team. James then pulls a gun on Thom, refusing to surrender, and demands Thom hand over the coins, revealing that he’s working for the British government. The vault locks down trapping them inside, however, James' diving experience affords him the ability to swim to safety and he abandons the other two.

Running out of time, Thom suspects that the key to stopping the flow of water into the vault is tricking the scale by adding more weight and making it think the vault is full of water. He instructs Simon to stack the empty nitrogen canisters onto the scale for additional weight, but it is not enough to halt the flow of water. The team loses contact with Thom and Lorraine, believing they have drowned, until as a last resort Simon himself climbs onto the scale with a radio broadcasting the world cup commentary, with the last bit of weight ceasing the water flow.

The vault begins to drain, and Thom and Lorraine are able to evade the bank security and escape to the square where the fans watch Spain defeat the Netherlands for their first World Cup title.

At the British Embassy, James has reported to Margaret, an associate of both his and Walter’s, and delivers the coins, only to find out that the coins are fakes and that Walter is still in possession of the originals. As the team relaxes in Saint Tropez, Walter finds that the treasure is buried under the Bank of England. A new heist begins two years later as the 2012 Olympics begin in London.

Cast

Release
The Vault was released theatrically on January 15, 2021 in Brazil and Taiwan, and in March in the U.S. On July 31, it was made available on Netflix. On Amazon Prime Video in the U.K.

In Spain, the film was initially intended to be theatrically released in autumn 2020, but the release was postponed to November 12, 2021 due to the COVID-19 pandemic, which caused the shelving of all Telecinco Cinema titles pending for theatrical release.

Box office
It opened with €1.2 million on its first weekend in Spain, becoming the best Spanish box-office debut so far in the year in that regard. The film grossed $9 million worldwide ($6.9 million in Spain).

Reception
 The website's critics consensus reads, "Its runtime passes painlessly enough, but The Vault's slickly engineered thrills are dulled by familiarity."

See also 
 List of Spanish films of 2021

Notes

References

External links
 
 

2021 action thriller films
2021 crime thriller films
2021 multilingual films
English-language Spanish films
2020s English-language films
2020s heist films
2020s Spanish films
2020s Spanish-language films
Films about bank robbery
Films about the FIFA World Cup
Films directed by Jaume Balagueró
Films produced by Álvaro Augustin
Films produced by Ghislain Barrois
Films set in 2009
Films set in 2010
Films set in Cambridge
Films set in London
Films set in Madrid
Films set in Saint-Tropez
Films shot in Madrid
Spain at the 2010 FIFA World Cup
Spanish action thriller films
Spanish crime thriller films
Spanish heist films
Spanish multilingual films
Telecinco Cinema films